Sebastián Hernán Bertoli (born 16 October 1977) is an Argentine former professional footballer who played as a goalkeeper.

Career
Bertoli had youth team spells with Universitario (PA), Newell's Old Boys and Racing Club. His senior career got underway in 1997 with Unión Crespo, which preceded moves to Don Bosco, Universitario (VLSM), Germinal and Atlético Paraná between 1998 and 2003. In 2003, Bertoli joined Torneo Argentino B side Patronato. He made one hundred and two appearances in his first four years, which ended with promotion to the 2008–09 Torneo Argentino A. Patronato were promoted again in 2009–10 and in 2015, during which period he featured two hundred and ninety times.

He also scored ten goals, with his first coming against Gimnasia y Esgrima on 18 May 2014; netting a 94th-minute penalty to draw 1–1. All ten goals were penalty-kicks. He made his top-flight debut on 6 February 2016 versus San Lorenzo, which was the first of forty-two appearances in his opening two seasons in the Primera División; scoring six penalties in the process, including the first versus River Plate in April 2016. Bertoli retired at the conclusion of the 2018–19 Primera División campaign. He played in five hundred and sixty-four matches for Patronato, with four hundred and eighty-six of those arriving in senior, league football.

Honours
Patronato
Torneo Argentino B: 2007–08
Torneo Argentino A: 2009–10

References

External links

1977 births
Living people
People from Paraná, Entre Ríos
Argentine footballers
Association football goalkeepers
Torneo Argentino B players
Torneo Argentino A players
Primera Nacional players
Argentine Primera División players
Club Atlético Patronato footballers
Sportspeople from Entre Ríos Province